Meteor Rain is a 2001 Taiwanese drama starring Jerry Yan, Vanness Wu and Ken Chu of F4 and Rainie Yang. It is a supplementary mini-series of the Meteor Garden series which is based on Japanese shōjo manga series, written by Yoko Kamio. It was produced by Comic Ritz International Production (可米瑞智國際藝能有限公司) with Angie Chai (柴智屏) as producer. It consists of three stand alone episodes that happened at different times before, during and after Meteor Garden. They are referred to as chapters focusing on each F4 members, except for Hua Ze Lei (Vic Chou).

The series was broadcast on free-to-air Chinese Television System (CTS) (華視) from September 2001 to January 2002 following the main series Meteor Garden, which was broadcast in April 2001. It was followed by the sequel Meteor Garden II, which was broadcast from 11 November to 25 December 2002.

Synopsis
Mei Zuo's Chapter
Mei Zuo (Vanness Wu) (Akira Mimasaka in manga series) got pick-pocketed by a Japanese girl, Ai Sha, struggling to survive in Taiwan. Ai Sha fools Mei Zuo several times before she finally reveals the truth. Ai Sha recently left Japan to find her grandmother. Mei Zuo agrees to help her and, after several events take place, Ai Sha and Mei Zuo start to practice dancing together. The explanation for this is that Ai Sha believes the best way to find her grandmother is to enter and win a televised dance contest. At the end of this chapter, a romance is strongly hinted at.

Xi Men's Chapter
Xiao You (Rainie Yang) (Yuki in manga series) comes back from Canada by herself on a quest for her love. She attempts to rekindle her relationship with Xi Men (Ken Chu) (Soujiroh Nishikado in manga series) and at first seems to be unsuccessful. After an occurrence at the bar, Xi Men and Xiao You confront each other about their behaviors. Later Xi Men reveals to Xiao You a bit of his past and tells her about this girl, Xiao Gen, he once loved. Xiao Gen had discovered something very special, but he had been somewhat afraid of his feelings and had greatly disappointed her by not showing up. Inspired by the story, Xiao You goes on a time-consuming search for the "special thing" that Xiao Gen had wanted to show Xi Men.

Dao Ming Si's Chapter
There are two parts to this chapter. It explains several scenes that took place in Meteor Garden. Dao Ming Si (Jerry Yan) (Tsukasa Domyouji in manga series) is charged with a crime and flees. He narrowly escapes the police, by jumping off a train and lies unconscious on a beach. A young girl by the name of Xin Xin finds him and Dao Ming Si is temporarily taken in by Ah Yuan, who appears to be Xin Xin's father. Ah Yuan and Xin Xin live in a simple shack by the beach and are not wealthy. There are several twists to this plot, the main one being that Xin Xin does not talk. Apparently, Xin Xin is not mute; she was simply traumatized by something that happened to her in the past. Thanks to Xin Xin's advances, Dao Ming Si and Xin Xin quickly bond. However problems arise in the second part of this chapter, when Ah Yuan learns that Dao Ming Si is wanted by the police and Dao Ming Si learns the truth about Ah Yuan & Xin Xin's past.

Cast
 Jerry Yan as Dao Ming Si (道明寺)
 Ken Chu as Xi Men (西門)
 Vanness Wu as Mei Zhuo (美作)
 Vic Chou as Hua Ze Lei (花泽类)
 Rainie Yang as Xiao You (小優)
 Senda Aisa as Ai Sha
 Pally Chien as Xiao Gen

Production
 Several of the filming locations in this mini series are identical to those in the Taiwanese drama Mars. The beach where Dao Ming Si stays at and the cafe/coffeeshop where Mei Zhuo and Ai Sha meet at are just some of the locations.
 In Dao Ming Si's chapter, there were several visible contradictions in the story. He has the same hairstyle that he did at the end of Meteor Garden. Also Dao Ming Si develops a mild attitude during his respective time with Xin Xin; at the beginning Meteor Garden Dao Ming Si's attitude is much worse. These details strongly contradict the fact that Dao Ming Si's chapter takes place before the first season of Meteor Garden. But several sources do state that the respective chapter takes place before the original series.
 The series was first aired in the Philippines on ABS-CBN in 2003 and GMA Network in 2007.

See also 
Meteor Garden
Meteor Garden II

References

External links 
 Meteor Rain on YAEntertainment

Boys Over Flowers
Taiwanese drama television series
Chinese Television System original programming
Taiwanese television dramas based on manga